Truett is a both a surname and a given name. Notable people with the name include:

S. Truett Cathy (1921–2014), founder of the American fast food restaurant chain Chick-fil-A in 1946
Truett S. Beasley (born 1953), American comedian known as Killer Beaz
Truett Latimer (born 1928), American politician from Texas
Truett Sewell (1907–1989), American baseball player known as Rip Sewell
Truett Smith (1924–2000), American football player
Alexander H. Truett (1833–1898), American soldier
Geoff Truett (1935–2015), English footballer
George Washington Truett (1867–1944), American clergyman

See also
 Walter Truett Anderson (born 1933), American political scientist
 Homer Truett Bone (1883–1970), American judge
 Daniel Truett Cathy (born 1953), American businessman
 S. Truett Cathy (1921–2014), American entrepreneur
 Truitt